The Bay-class tugboat is a class of  icebreaking tugboats of the United States Coast Guard, with hull numbers WTGB-101 through to WTGB-109.

They can also ram pressure ridges of up to eight feet in thickness. These vessels are equipped with a system to lubricate their progress through the ice, by bubbling air through the hull.

Service Life Extension Program (SLEP) 
A SLEP is a major overhaul intended to extend a vessel's service life; it is typically scheduled as the vessel approaches the end of its originally planned service life. The Bay-class tugboat SLEP project includes significant system upgrades and improvements to the propulsion plant; to the heating, ventilation, and air conditioning systems; installation of an engine-room fire-suppression system; boat launching davit replacement; Oily Water Separator replacement; stack exhaust configuration modifications; hull air-ice lubrication system; and crew habitability improvements to meet current standards (including removal of lead paint). When the Coast Guard described the Bay-class tugboat SLEP to the U.S. Congress in 2015, the first SLEP was scheduled to take 12 months; however, the Coast Guard anticipated that after the third SLEP the Coast Guard Yard would have enough familiarity with the process to complete two SLEPs per year, with an anticipated duration of 9 months each. The first of nine cutters (Morro Bay) entered SLEP at the Coast Guard Yard on July 1, 2014. Morro Bay returned to her homeport of Cleveland in September 2015

Ships
 (WTGB-101) Katmai Bay (Homeport - Sault Ste. Marie, MI / Builder: Tacoma Boatbuilding Company)
 (WTGB-102) Bristol Bay (Homeport - Detroit, MI / Builder: Tacoma Boatbuilding Company)
 (WTGB-103) Mobile Bay (Homeport - Sturgeon Bay, WI / Builder: Tacoma Boatbuilding Company)
 (WTGB-104) Biscayne Bay (Homeport - St. Ignace, MI / Builder: Tacoma Boatbuilding Company)
 (WTGB-105) Neah Bay (Homeport - Cleveland, OH / Builder: Tacoma Boatbuilding Company)
 (WTGB-106) Morro Bay (Homeport - Cleveland, OH / Builder: Tacoma Boatbuilding Company]
 (WTGB-107) Penobscot Bay (Homeport - Bayonne, NJ / Builder: Bay City Marine Incorporated)
 (WTGB-108) Thunder Bay (Homeport - Rockland, ME / Builder: Bay City Marine Incorporated)
 (WTGB-109) Sturgeon Bay (Homeport - Bayonne, NJ / Builder: Bay City Marine Incorporated)
 (WTGB-110) Curtis Bay (Construction cancelled)

See also

 Bay-class lifeboat - three vessels with the Canadian Coast Guard
 Samuel Risley-class icebreaker and buoy tender with the Canadian Coast Guard

References

External links

USCG page
USCG Magazine article
Welland canal page

 
Ships built by Tacoma Boatbuilding Company